The 2021 season was the 90th season for the Washington Football Team and their second under head coach Ron Rivera. Some additions and changes include the team hiring Martin Mayhew as general manager and Marty Hurney as another high-ranking executive. With the hiring of Mayhew, who is black, Washington became the first team in NFL history to concurrently have a minority general manager, head coach, and team president. Ryan Kerrigan, the franchise's all-time sack leader, became a free agent in the offseason and played the year with division rival Philadelphia Eagles.

Washington failed to improve upon their 7–9 record from the previous season, failed to repeat as division champions, and missed the playoffs for the fifth time in their past six seasons after a Week 17 home loss to the Philadelphia Eagles. Washington was also the first team since the 1995 Tampa Bay Buccaneers to have their final five games of the season be within the division. This season was also the last under the transitional "Football Team" moniker as they rebranded as the Commanders in 2022.

Draft

Notes
Washington received a third-round selection from San Francisco in exchange for offensive tackle Trent Williams.
Washington received a seventh-round selection and offensive tackle David Sharpe from Las Vegas in exchange for a 2020 sixth-round selection.
Washington traded a seventh-round selection (244th overall) to Miami in exchange for a seventh-round selection (258th overall) and offensive guard Ereck Flowers.
Washington received sixth- and seventh-round selections (225th and 240th overall) from Philadelphia in exchange for a 2022 fifth-round selection.

Staff

Final roster

Schedule

Preseason
The preseason was reduced from four games to three with the regular season expanding to 17.

Regular season

Note: Intra-division opponents are in bold text.

Game summaries

Week 1: vs. Los Angeles Chargers

Washington started the season with a frustrating loss at home.  The Chargers scored a TD with a 3 yard Austin Ekeler run on the first drive of the game.  The rest of the scoring in the first half was an exchange of field goals which gave the Chargers a 13-9 lead. To mirror the start of the first half Washington scored a TD on the first drive of the half, with an 11 yard pass from Taylor Heinicke to Logan Thomas.  Washington got the ball back in their own redzone thanks to a dubious call ruling Herbert had fumbled into the end zone under pressure from Montez Sweat.  Hopkins then missed a field goal before the decisive moment came at the start of the 4th quarter.  William Jackson intercepted Herbert in the Washington redzone but on the subsequent play Antonio Gibson fumbled the ball on the Washington 5 yard which was recovered by the Charger who then scored the game winning TD with a 3 yard pass to Mike Williams.  This would be QB Ryan Fitzpatrick’s last game, as he suffered a season ending injury in the second quarter and would promptly retire after the season.

Week 2: vs. New York Giants

A back and forth shootout, Washington capitalized on a late opportunity to escape with a 30-29 win. After Washington took a 14-10 lead into halftime, the Giants scored on their first 4 possessions of the second half to take a 26-20 lead. Washington answered back with a touchdown from Heinicke to Ricky Seals-Jones to take a 27-26 lead, but the Giants capitalized on a late Heinicke interception to take a 29-27 lead. After Washington got into field goal range, Dustin Hopkins missed a 48-yard field goal to win the game. However, the Giants were offside, which nullified the miss and gave Washington one untimed down, since a game cannot end on a defensive penalty. Hopkins made his second attempt from 43 yards to give Washington the win. This was Washington's first win over the Giants since Week 8 of the 2018 season, and improved their record to 1-1 on the season.

Week 3: at Buffalo Bills

Buffalo got out to a 21-0 lead early, and Washington was never able to fully recover in a 43-21 loss. Josh Allen threw for 358 yards and four touchdowns, and ran for another in the fourth to give Buffalo a 43-14 lead. The 43 points allowed were the most points Washington has allowed under Ron Rivera, and were the most points they had allowed since week 17 of the 2019 season against the Dallas Cowboys (until Week 16 of this season). Washington dropped to 1-2 on the season.

Week 4: at Atlanta Falcons

Washington was able to recover from an early 10-0 deficit to defeat the Falcons 34-30 behind 290 yards and 3 touchdowns from Taylor Heinicke. After the 10-0 deficit, Washington scored two touchdowns in the second to take a 13-10 lead. After the Falcons took a 17-13 lead into half, DeAndre Carter returned the second half kickoff 101 yards to give the lead back to Washington. The Falcons took back the lead and then extended it to 30-22 early in the fourth, but Heinicke threw two touchdowns in the final four minutes to give Washington the win. The win improved Washington to 2-2 on the season, and 2-0 in the conference. It was their first win over the Falcons since 2003.

Week 5: vs. New Orleans Saints

Washington suffered an 11-point loss to the New Orleans Saints.

Week 6: vs. Kansas City Chiefs

Week 7: at Green Bay Packers

Week 8: at Denver Broncos

Week 10: vs. Tampa Bay Buccaneers

In a rematch of their Wild Card matchup from the previous season, Washington upset the Buccaneers 29-19 to end their four-game losing streak. Tom Brady threw two interceptions in the first quarter, which Washington turned into 10 points to take a 13-0 lead early in the second. Tampa cut the lead to 23-19 early in the fourth, but Washington sealed the game with a 10 minute, 19-play touchdown drive. With the win, Washington improved to 3-6 on the season.

Week 11: at Carolina Panthers

This was head coach Ron Rivera's first return to Charlotte since his dismissal from the Panthers on December 1, 2019. Rivera previously served as the Panthers head coach from 2011–2019, led the team to a franchise-best 15-1 record en route to Super Bowl 50 in the 2015 season, and is the franchise's winningest head coach, having won 76 games with the team. Both teams traded a pair of touchdowns in the first half, with Newton throwing for a touchdown while rushing for another while Taylor Heinicke threw for two touchdowns. Washington took their first lead in the third quarter with Heinicke's throwing a touchdown to DeAndre Carter. After the Panthers tied it early in the fourth quarter, Washington got back-to-back field goals from Joey Slye. The Panthers' last shot to win the game was denied when Cam Newton got sacked on fourth down. With the win, Washington won back-to-back games for the first time in the season and improved to 4-6.

Week 12: vs. Seattle Seahawks

Washington hosted the 3–7 Seahawks with both teams needing a win to stay relevant in the NFC playoff picture. Washington kicker Joey Slye was injured on a blocked extra point that was returned for a defensive 2-point conversion by Seahawks defensive tackle Rasheem Green. A touchdown pass late in the 4th quarter on 4th and goal from Heinicke to Logan Thomas was overturned, giving Seattle a chance down 8; while Wilson hit Freddie Swain for a score with 15 seconds left, Kendall Fuller intercepted the 2-point pass to keep Washington with a 17–15 lead. Initially, Seattle appeared to recover an onside kick, but the play was called back due to an illegal formation, and Washington was able to recover the subsequent onside kick attempt to seal the victory and improve to 5–6. It was their first Monday Night Football victory since 2014.

Week 13: at Las Vegas Raiders

Week 14: vs. Dallas Cowboys

Week 15: at Philadelphia Eagles

Week 16: at Dallas Cowboys

Washington allowed their most points to the Cowboys in franchise history in giving up 56. The loss dropped Washington to 6–9.

Week 17: vs. Philadelphia Eagles

For the first time since 2019 and fourth time in five seasons, Washington was swept by the Eagles. Despite leading through three quarters, Washington could not withstand a second-half rally by Philadelphia, and a late rally of their own was snuffed out by a game ending interception. Washington was eliminated from playoff contention with the 20–16 loss.

Week 18: at New York Giants

The game was the final for the team to be played as the Washington Football Team, as they rebranded as the Commanders in 2022. With the win, Washington swept the Giants for the first time since 2011. Their defense allowed 167 total yards in the win.

Standings

Division

Conference

References

External links
 

Washington
Washington Football Team seasons
Washington Football Team